Ondřej Vetchý (born 16 May 1962) is a Czech actor.  He was born in Jihlava, Czechoslovakia.

He is currently employed at The Drama Club (DC) in Prague.

Notable performances 
 2005 – Katurian in The Pillowman, DC
 2004 – Carluccio in The Businessman from Smyrna by Carlo Goldoni, DC
 2002 – Count Paolo Grazia in Mask and The Face by Luigi Chiarelli, DC
 2000 – Samson Martin - Kennedy Phillips in Wild Spring by Arnold Wesker, Divadlo Ungelt
 1999 – Vincent van Gogh in Vincent by Gordon Smith, Divadlo Ungelt

Selected filmography 
 2022 – Medieval
 2020 – Betrayer
 2019 – Women on the Run
 2018 – My Uncle Archimedes
 2017 – Barefoot
 2016 - Stuck with a Perfect Woman
 2014 – František Vedral in Příběh kmotra
 2013 – Elli in Colette
 2012 – Jirka Luňák in Sunday League – Pepik Hnatek's Final Match (Czech Lion for Best Supporting Actor)
 2011 – Tomáš in Innocence
 2010 – Jirka Luňák aka Jiřina in Okresní přebor
 2009 – in Broken Promise
 2009 – Jan Pavel in An Earthly Paradise for the Eyes
 2001 – František Sláma in Dark Blue World
 1997 – Kvido's Father in Those Wonderful Years That Sucked
 1996 – Brož in Kolya
 1995 – Bajnyš Zisovič in Valley of Exile
 1991 – Arnošt in The Territory of White Deer
 1988 – Dan in Dům pro dva (nomination for European Film Award for Best Young Actor or Actress)
 1985 – Janek in Give the Devil his Due

External links

1962 births
Living people
People from Jihlava
Czech male stage actors
Czech male film actors
Czech male television actors
20th-century Czech male actors
21st-century Czech male actors
Czech Lion Awards winners